Barbara Ganz (born 28 July 1964) is a Swiss former racing cyclist. She was the Swiss National Road Race champion in 1993. She also competed in the women's road race at the 1988 Summer Olympics.

References

External links
 

1964 births
Living people
Swiss female cyclists
Cyclists at the 1988 Summer Olympics
Olympic cyclists of Switzerland
Sportspeople from Thurgau
21st-century Swiss women